Palaina patula is a species of minute land snail with an operculum, a terrestrial gastropod mollusk or micromollusks in the family Diplommatinidae. This species is endemic to Palau.

References

Palaina
Endemic fauna of Palau
Molluscs of Oceania
Molluscs of the Pacific Ocean
Critically endangered fauna of Oceania
Gastropods described in 1866
Taxonomy articles created by Polbot